Exobasidium reticulatum is a plant pathogen.

References

External links 

Fungal plant pathogens and diseases
Ustilaginomycotina
Fungi described in 1912